Erwin Rüddel (born 21 December 1955) is a German politician of the Christian Democratic Union (CDU) who has been serving as a member of the Bundestag from the state of Rhineland-Palatinate since 2009.

Political career 
Rüddel was member of the council of Windhagen from 1984 until 2018. He served as a member of the State Parliament of Rhineland-Palatinate in 1987 and again from 1998 until 2009.

From 2003 until 2008, Rüddel was part of the leadership of the CDU in Rhineland-Palatinate, under successive chairpersons Christoph Böhr (2003-2006) and Christian Baldauf (2006-2008).

Rüddel became a member of the Bundestag in the 2009 German federal election, representing the Neuwied district. He is a member of the Health Committee, which he has been chairing since 2018.

Other activities

Corporate boards 
 Süwag Energie, Member of the Advisory Board

Non-profit organizations 
 Association of German Foundations, Member of the Parliamentary Advisory Board
 Lions Clubs International, Member

References

External links 

  
 Bundestag biography 

1955 births
Living people
Members of the Bundestag for Rhineland-Palatinate
Members of the Bundestag 2021–2025
Members of the Bundestag 2017–2021
Members of the Bundestag 2013–2017
Members of the Bundestag 2009–2013
Members of the Bundestag for the Christian Democratic Union of Germany